The Korath Range is a mountain range in the Southern Nations, Nationalities, and Peoples' Region of southern Ethiopia. The youngest lava flow, which issued from a cone in the middle of the range, has been radiocarbon dated at 7900 BP, although a more recent radiocarbon date of between 30,000 BP and 7900-9500 BP has also been obtained.

The Korath Range was emplaced along the Lake Turkana Rift, a segment of the East African Rift that extends north from Kenya.

See also
List of volcanoes in Ethiopia

References

Mountain ranges of Ethiopia
Volcanoes of Ethiopia
Tuff cones
Quaternary volcanoes
Southern Nations, Nationalities, and Peoples' Region